Telephlebia tryoni is a species of dragonfly in the family Telephlebiidae,
known as the coastal evening darner. 
It is a medium to large, dark chestnut brown dragonfly with dark markings on the leading edge and base of its wings.
It is endemic to eastern Australia, where it has been found along streams in rainforests and open areas,
and flies at dusk.

Gallery

See also
 List of Odonata species of Australia

References

Telephlebiidae
Odonata of Australia
Endemic fauna of Australia
Taxa named by Robert John Tillyard
Insects described in 1917